Ibb is a city in Yemen, the capital of Ibb Governorate, located about  northeast of Mocha and  south of Sana'a.  
A market town and administrative centre developed during the Ottoman Empire, it is one of the most important medium-sized cities in the country. It is situated on a mountain ridge, surrounded by fertile land.  As of 2005, it had a population of 160,000.

History 

Ibb has been occupied since ancient times, and due to its strategical importance, the Ottomans used it as an administrative centre. It thrived as a market town and the Ottomans established the Wednesday market in Ibb. Ibb was governed by a semi-autonomous emir until 1944, when the emirate was abolished. At times in its history many people have migrated to Ibb from areas of Yemen which had been experiencing drought, to find work in farming. In the mid 1950s there was reportedly an outbreak of smallpox in the city.

German explorer, Hermann Burchardt, photographed the city in 1901, photos now held at the Ethnological Museum of Berlin.

Climate 
Due to its high altitude, Ibb has a subtropical highland climate (Köppen climate classification: Cwa), and is one of the wettest areas of Yemen, typically receiving 800–1200 mm of rain per annum.

Notable landmarks 

The city is noted for its towering stone houses, with geometrical friezes and circular stained glass windows known as qamiriya. The main mosque was built during the Ottoman period, and there are other mosques and also a fortress in the vicinity, closed to visitors. An ancient overhead aqueduct still remains. Ibb University was established in 1996. Ibb also contains an art centre and museum and hotels such as Saba Tourist Hotel and Al-Riyad Hotel. The main football team is Al Sha'ab Ibb.

Notable people 
 Owais al-Qarani, Muslim saint
 Abdul Rahman al-Iryani - former President of Yemen
 Abdul Karim al-Iryani - former Prime Minister of Yemen
 Abdul Aziz Al-Maqaleh - poet and writer
 Mutahar al-Iryani - prominent historian and poet
 Brian "The Lion" Mihtar - professional boxer
 Abdul Majeed al-Zindani - founder and head of Iman University
 Hamdan Dammag - novelist and computer scientist

See also 
 Aghrab Beni Awad
 Jibla
 As-Sahul Valley

References

External links

Populated places in Ibb Governorate